Messori is an Italian surname. Notable people with the surname include:

Filippo Messori (born 1973), Italian tennis player
Matteo Messori (born 1976), Italian keyboard player, conductor, musicologist and teacher
Vittorio Messori (born 1941), Italian journalist and writer

Italian-language surnames